Ogcodes eugonatus is a species of small-headed flies (insects in the family Acroceridae).

References

Acroceridae
Articles created by Qbugbot
Insects described in 1872
Diptera of North America